godheadSilo is an eponymously titled EP by godheadSilo, released on March 12, 1996, by Sub Pop.

Track listing

Personnel 

godheadSilo
 Dan Haugh – drums
 Mike Kunka – bass guitar

Technical personnel
 godheadSilo – mixing
 Tim Green – recording, backing vocals (B1)
 Michael Lastra – recording, mixing
 Joe Preston – recording, backing vocals (B1)

Release history

References 

1996 EPs
GodheadSilo albums
Sub Pop EPs